The 1929 Campeonato Carioca, the 24th edition of that championship, kicked off on April 7, 1929 and ended on November 24, 1929. It was organized by AMEA (Associação Metropolitana de Esportes Atléticos, or Metropolitan Athletic Sports Association). Eleven teams participated. Vasco da Gama won the title for the 3rd time. No teams were relegated.

Participating teams 

After Villa Isabel left the league, AMEA invited Bonsucesso, winner of the last three editions of the Second level to join the first level.

System 
The tournament would be disputed in a double round-robin format, with the team with the most points winning the title.

Championship

Playoffs

References 

Campeonato Carioca seasons
Carioca